DC Countdown may refer to:

Countdown to Infinite Crisis, a lead in to the DC Comics event Infinite Crisis
Countdown (DC Comics), a weekly series follow up to the DC Comics series 52